Panama has appeared in 17 Summer Games, making its debut appearance at the 1928 Summer Olympics. They have never appeared in the Winter Games. The country has won three medals (one gold and two bronze medals), all in athletics. Long jumper Irving Saladino won Panama's first and only Olympic gold medal.

Medal tables

Medals by Games

Medals by sport

List of medalists

See also
 List of flag bearers for Panama at the Olympics
 Panama at the Paralympics

External links

References